Emilio Córdova is a Peruvian chess player who holds the title of Grandmaster, which he was awarded in 2008.

Córdova has represented Peru in numerous chess olympiads, including 2004, 2006, 2010, 2014, 2016, 2018, and 2022.

Córdova qualified for the Chess World Cup 2017, where he was defeated by Richárd Rapport in the first round.

In August 2021, Córdova earned clear second place in the Charlotte Chess Center's Summer 2020 GM Norm Invitational held in Charlotte, North Carolina with an undefeated score of 6.0/9.

In November 2022, Córdova tied for 1st place at the 2022 US Masters with a score of 7/9.

References

External links
Emilio Córdova chess games at 365Chess.com

Living people
Chess grandmasters
Peruvian chess players
Chess Olympiad competitors
Year of birth missing (living people)
20th-century Peruvian people
21st-century Peruvian people